John Whitbourn (born 1958) is an English author of novels and short stories focusing on alternative histories set in a 'Catholic' universe. His works are characterised by wry humour, the reality of magic and a sustained attempt to reflect on the interaction between religion and politics on a personal and social scale. The Encyclopedia of Fantasy (1997) says he 'writes well, with dry wit'.

Works

Whitbourn is an archaeology graduate and published author since 1987. His first book, A Dangerous Energy, won the BBC/Victor Gollancz Fantasy Novel Prize (judged by, amongst others, Terry Pratchett) in 1991. In 1562, Elizabeth I suffered from a near-fatal bout of smallpox. In reality she recovered, but that did not occur in the world of A Dangerous Energy and its sequels. Instead, Elizabeth I died from that infection, and her cousin, Mary, Queen of Scots, succeeded to the English throne, leading to a second and permanent Catholic Counter Reformation in England and Scotland.

A Dangerous Energy was reviewed as "the first Counter-Reformation science fiction novel", and To Build Jerusalem (1995) furthered the story of that particular alternate history. The Two Confessions, a third and concluding book in the loosely linked series (belatedly revealed by the author to be The Pevensey Trilogy), was published in 2013.

Whereas A Dangerous Energy focussed on the Church, and To Build Jerusalem on ‘high politics’, The Two Confessions concerns events in the life of a young would-be industrialist and entrepreneur. Chafing against the reactionary constraints of his civilisation, he stumbles upon a deep secret from the past and is commissioned (as an expendable person of ill-repute) to solve the associated centuries-old mystery. Stirred by his actions, events move to a dramatic conclusion between the most powerful forces of the age. The Two Confessions title is also a play on both the sacrament of confession and a clash between two competing ideological ‘confessions’.

Popes and Phantoms (1993) followed the success of A Dangerous Energy and featured the stoic and somewhat chilly ‘Admiral Slovo’ (a family name often favoured in Whitbourn's works) blazing a trail across the Italian Renaissance – albeit Whitbourn's idiosyncratic and wildly skewed alternate history version of same. Many of the prominent figures of the time are met within and influenced (not always for the better) by their encounter with Slovo. Popes and Phantoms was also published in Russia by Mir Fantastiki. In 2021 the book was republished in its original and substantially larger form as Popes and Phantoms – Redux! Resurgam! complete with new cover. It included a previously deleted whole second ‘Book’ and ending, plus the author’s comments in a Foreword & Apology (not least for the title's extension) and Afterword & Apologia, together with sundry Odd Thoughts.

At the same time Whitbourn has published a steady stream of short stories, including the extensive Binscombe Tales series of supernatural stories set in his ancestral homeland. They were published in two volume collected form as Binscombe Tales – Sinister Saxon Stories and More Binscombe Tales – Sinister Sutangli Stories by Ash-Tree Press in 1998 and 1999, and reissued in ebook and print editions by Spark Furnace Books in 2011.

His fifth book, The Royal Changeling, (described as the first work of Jacobite propaganda for several centuries) was published in 1998 by Simon & Schuster's Earthlight imprint. The book recounts the Monmouth Rebellion and Battle of Sedgemoor (1685) accurately and in great detail, while adding a layer of fantasy that brings figures from English mythology to life as both combatants and political forces. The fantasy layer builds momentum and becomes increasingly vivid as the story of the protagonist, Theophilus Oglethorpe, unfolds. Toward the end, as Theophilus engages in pitched battle with Monmouth and his allies, his wife, Eleanor, is simultaneously besieged by supernatural forces in their mansion in Godalming, Surrey.

Subsequent years have seen the release by the same company of his trio of books which he insists on calling The Downs-Lord triptych (not "trilogy"), including Downs-Lord Dawn (1999), Downs-Lord Day (2000) and Downs-Lord Doomsday (2002). These depict the adventures of a 17th-century down-at-luck curate who crosses into an alternate Earth where – though all physical features are similar to ours – the hapless local humans are little more than food animals of the monstrous life-form known as Null. He appoints himself their liberator, goes back for 17th century weapons, and manages to defeat the Null (at least in that world's version of the British Isles) and in the process makes himself a God-Emperor. But further complications arise from the interference of a power-hungry 19th Century American professor, extraterrestrial creatures known as "Angels" – which is rather a misnomer – and the exploits of the Emperor's Corps of diplomats who refine Machiavellism to unprecedented subtlety.

Whitbourn's Frankenstein’s Legions, a Steampunk and zombie-fiction tinged extrapolation of Mary Shelley's classic gothic tale, was published in both print and eBook form in 2012.

Whitbourn's Nothing is True… - The First Book of Farouk, was published in 2018. Supposedly ‘divined’ by Whitbourn, and purportedly edited with copious scholarly notes by Philip Larkin's long-term lover and muse, Monica Jones (1922-2001), it comprises a fantasy-tinged and highly unreliable alleged autobiography by the infamous playboy-monarch King Farouk I of Egypt (1920-1965). He reveals himself to be an all-conquering global statesman riding and bestriding 20th century history, and an incomparable lover and erotic artiste besides. Faithful to the book's title, little (to put it mildly) within is likely to be true.
A companion and concluding volume, And Everything is Permissible - The Second Book of Farouk, covering the deposed King's sybaritic European exile, 1952–65, was published in 2019. Its title completes that of the first book, citing valedictory words attributed to Hassan i Sabbah, twelfth century founder of the Order of Assassins.

Collectively, The Book of Farouk is described as 'disgracefully amusing - and amusingly disgraceful!'

In 2020 Whitbourn published The Age of the Triffids, a sequel to John Wyndham's The Day of the Triffids (1951). Set a quarter century later, it seeks to provide a ‘what happened next?’ to supplement its predecessor's somewhat abrupt ending, whilst paying due homage to  Wyndham's masterwork.  Whitbourn has said that this project represents fulfillment of a life-long ambition arising from likewise longstanding admiration for Wyndham. For copyright reasons this book is not for sale outside Canada and New Zealand.

2020 also saw publication of his novel BABYLONdon, a historical fantasy set during the Gordon Riots of 1780. As per its ‘blurb':
‘London is on fire and in the hands of the mob. BABYLON rises from the Infernal depths to replace England’s Capital and rule forever.
Enter the enigmatic Cavaliere, sent to sort things out, armed only with a swordstick—and frightfully good manners.’

It is curious that the Gordon Riots, an astounding instance of complete loss of control over an Imperial Capital, seems to have almost vanished down an Orwellian ‘Memory Hole’ in English history. If the rampant Mob had seized the Bank of England's gold reserves—as they so nearly did—the subsequent history of Britain would have been radically different.

Whitbourn's works were reissued in eBook format by Orion Publishing Group Ltd's SF Gateway in 2013.

ALTERED ENGLANDS, Whitbourn's collected short stories 1990 to date—and thus a substantial, 600+ page tome—was published in 2020.
Its cover features a depiction of The Long Man of Wilmington, an enigmatic hill figure often referenced in Whitbourn's writing.
The Long Man or Giant—Southern England's answer to the Sphinx—has come to symbolise the author's beloved Downs Country.
For further reading re the Long Man, see Rodney Castleden's comprehensive and elegantly written The Wilmington Giant: The Quest for a Lost Myth, 1983.

In December 2020 Whitbourn also released a ‘Young Adult' Fantasy novel, Amy-Faith & The Stronghold, the first volume of a projected series. A sequel, Amy-Faith & The Enemy of Calm, duly appeared in 2021.

A rare press interview with Whitbourn in 2000 was entitled Confessions of a Counter-Reformation Green Anarcho-Jacobite.

In 2021 Whitbourn won the Cædmon Prize, awarded annually by Anglo-Saxon studies society Ða Engliscan Gesiðas (The English Companions), for a poem composed in Old English style and judged to be in accordance with 'the spirit of Old English poetry.’

In 2014 a new housing development in the village of Binscombe, Surrey, was named Whitbourn Mews in honour of the author and his The Binscombe Tales series.

Complete Works

Books

Short stories

Articles
{| class="wikitable" width="100%"
! Title !! Published in !! Year
|-
|"The Day The Cornish Invaded Guildford"   (1497 rebellion) || The Surrey Advertiser || 2 June 1989.
|-
|"The Bones of a Revolutionary"  (Tom Paine's remains) || The Surrey Advertiser || 22 September 1989.
|-
|"A Gift To Woden From Pevensey?" || The Parish Pump No. 65 || Spring 1990.
|-
|"A Gift To Woden From Pevensey?" || Wiðowinde (Bindweed). Journal of Ða Engliscan Geðisdas (The English Companions) No. 88 || August 1990.
|-
|"What Would Have Happened If..." || The Catholic Times || 6 November 1994
|-
|"Taking Fantastic Liberties With Our History" (Interview) || The Surrey Advertiser || 29 May 1998
|-
|SF & Fantasy Book Reviews. x30. || SFX Magazine || 1998-2004
|-
|"Sticks & Stones" || Wiðowinde (Bindweed). Journal of Ða Engliscan Geðisdas (The English Companions) No. 113 || Spring 1998
|-
|"Why I Like It Here" || Downs Country Magazine no. 22 || May 1998
|-
|"In the Shade of the Typewriter Tree" (Interview) || Interzone no 135 || September 1998
|-
|"'Orrible Massacre in Sussex" || Downs Country Magazine no. 26 || January 1999
|-
|"The 'Prehistory' of St. Edmund's – 1534 – 1899" || Essay in The Catholic Parish of St. Edmund, King & Martyr, Godalming, 1899 – 1999 – A Centenary Commemorative History || November 1999.
|-
|"Monmouth's Stalin Organs – or Ingenious Inventions and Annoying Authors" || The So-ho Gazette – Newsletter of the 1685 Society || July 2000
|-
|"Confessions of a Counter-Reformation Green Anarcho-Jacobite" (Interview) || Starburst Magazine No. 266 || October 2000
|-
|"Whitbourn's Wisdom" (Interview) || SFX magazine no 73 ||  January 2001
|-
|"Angles, Saxons, Normans – & Vandals (& Scots)" || Wiðowinde (Bindweed). Journal of Ða Engliscan Geðisdas (The English Companions) No 128 || Summer 2002
|-
|"Looking For New England" || 3SF Magazine No 1 || October 2002
|-
|"A Hymn To Merrily" || All Hallows: Journal of the Ghost Story Society No 32 || February 2003
|-
|Author Profile – Phil Rickman  || SFX magazine no 124 || December 2004
|-
|"Borderline Gothic: Phil Rickman & The Merrily Watkins Series" || 21st Century Gothic: Great Gothic Novels Since 2000.  Ed. Danel Olson. The Scarecrow Press Inc. || 2011
|-
|Review of All Night North – Songs to Words by Philip Larkin. Various artists, produced by Jim Orwin. 2010  || About Larkin – Journal of The Philip Larkin Society. No. 41. Reprinted in bound 25th Anniversary Issue, July 2020  || April 2016 
|-
|"Interview with John Whitbourn by Peter Berard" || The San Antonio Review (USA). Volume III. Summer 2020 || 2020
|-
|"From Place to Place". Cædmon Prize winning poem || Wiðowinde (Bindweed). Journal of Ða Engliscan Geðisdas (The English Companions) No 201 || Spring 2022
|-
|"Larkin Goes Country" [Larkin in the lyrics of Rosanne Cash] || About Larkin – Journal of The Philip Larkin Society. No. 53. || April 2022
|-
|"Larkin & the Reading Job: Funk or Fix?" || About Larkin – Journal of The Philip Larkin Society. No. 54. || October 2022
|}

OtherPublish & Be Damned! The Suppressed/Depressed Edition. Ash-Tree Press. Web publication. 2003.

References

1.	^ Binscombe Tales website. https://binscombetales.com/

2.	^ Spark Furnace Books website. http://www.sparkfurnace.com/

3.	^ The Age of the Triffids. https://www.amazon.ca/dp/171274982X

4.	^ San Antonio Review interview. https://www.sareview.org/pub/sar3whitbourninterview/release/5

External links
Agent: John Jarrold 

John Whitbourn at Orion Publishing  and 'SF Gateway' Frankenstein's Legions'' at Spark Furnace 

English fantasy writers
Living people
1958 births
English male short story writers
English short story writers
English male novelists